Matthews Crossing is a river crossing on the Pembina River in the Canadian province of Alberta approximately  downstream from Entwistle.

History 
This river crossing was used by Indigenous people and packers before it was named. A pack trail, known as Jock's Trail, Jack's Trail or the Shining Bank Trail left the west end of Isle Lake, crossed the Pembina at this location. A packer named N. H. Jock used this trail to pack supplies to stores along the trail to the Peace River Country. A post office was established on the east side of the river in 1913 and operated until 1923. It was named for M. H. Matthews, the first postmaster.

In about 1920, a ferry was installed at Matthews Crossing. A succession of returned WWI veterans served as ferrymen. Eventually the ferry was moved down-river to Sangudo.

Matthews Crossing School was built in 1935 and operated until 1956. The Matthews Crossing Natural Area, more than 700 acres of boreal forest upstream from the crossing, has been designated as a park.

References

Localities in Lac Ste. Anne County